In mathematical logic and set theory, an ordinal collapsing function (or projection function) is a technique for defining (notations for) certain recursive large countable ordinals, whose principle is to give names to certain ordinals much larger than the one being defined, perhaps even large cardinals (though they can be replaced with recursively large ordinals at the cost of extra technical difficulty), and then "collapse" them down to a system of notations for the sought-after ordinal.  For this reason, ordinal collapsing functions are described as an impredicative manner of naming ordinals.

The details of the definition of ordinal collapsing functions vary, and get more complicated as greater ordinals are being defined, but the typical idea is that whenever the notation system "runs out of fuel" and cannot name a certain ordinal, a much larger ordinal is brought "from above" to give a name to that critical point.  An example of how this works will be detailed below, for an ordinal collapsing function defining the Bachmann–Howard ordinal (i.e., defining a system of notations up to the Bachmann–Howard ordinal).

The use and definition of ordinal collapsing functions is inextricably intertwined with the theory of ordinal analysis, since the large countable ordinals defined and denoted by a given collapse are used to describe the ordinal-theoretic strength of certain formal systems, typically subsystems of analysis (such as those seen in the light of reverse mathematics), extensions of Kripke–Platek set theory, Bishop-style systems of constructive mathematics or Martin-Löf-style systems of intuitionistic type theory.
(psi)(1)

An example leading up to the Bachmann–Howard ordinal 
The choice of the ordinal collapsing function given as example below imitates greatly the system introduced by Buchholz but is limited to collapsing one cardinal for clarity of exposition.  More on the relation between this example and Buchholz's system will be said below.

Definition 
Let  stand for the first uncountable ordinal , or, in fact, any ordinal which is an -number and guaranteed to be greater than all the countable ordinals which will be constructed (for example, the Church–Kleene ordinal is adequate for our purposes; but we will work with  because it allows the convenient use of the word countable in the definitions).

Assume  has been defined for all , and we wish to define .

In a more concise (although more obscure) way:

Computation of values of ψ 
To clarify how the function  is able to produce notations for certain ordinals, we now compute its first values.

Predicative start 
First consider . It contains ordinals  and so on. This shows that .

This contains all the ordinals up to  but not the latter, so . We therefore have:

 for all .

First impredicative values 
Again, .

Values of ψ up to the Feferman–Schütte ordinal 
The fact that  remains true for all  (note, in particular, that : but since now the ordinal  has been constructed there is nothing to prevent from going beyond this). So we have .

We then have .

Thus,  is the Feferman–Schütte ordinal.

Beyond the Feferman–Schütte ordinal 
So, if  enumerates the fixed points in question (which can also be noted  using the many-valued Veblen functions) we have , until the first fixed point  of the  itself, which will be  (and the first fixed point  of the  functions will be ). In this manner:
  is the Ackermann ordinal (the range of the notation  defined predicatively),
  is the "small" Veblen ordinal (the range of the notations  predicatively using finitely many variables),
  is the "large" Veblen ordinal (the range of the notations  predicatively using transfinitely-but-predicatively-many variables),

Ordinal notations up to the Bachmann–Howard ordinal 
We now explain more systematically how the  function defines notations for ordinals up to the Bachmann–Howard ordinal.

A note about base representations 
This "base  representation" is an obvious generalization of the Cantor normal form (which is the case ).

Some properties of ψ 
 The function  is non-decreasing and continuous (this is more or less obvious from its definition).
 If  with  then necessarily .
Then  is closed under addition, multiplication and exponentiation (because  is an -number, so ordinals less than it are closed under addition, multiplication and exponentiation). So , which was to be shown.
 Under the hypothesis of the previous lemma,  (indeed, the lemma shows that ).
Conversely, if we assume  for all  (in other words if  is the least possible with ), the lemma gives the desired property.

The ordinal notation 
Using the facts above, we can define a (canonical) ordinal notation for every  less than the Bachmann–Howard ordinal.

It remains to deal with the case where  is an -number: we have argued that, in this case, we can write  for some (possibly uncountable) ordinal : let  be the greatest possible such ordinal (which exists since  is continuous).

Note: Actually, we have defined canonical notations not just for ordinals below the Bachmann–Howard ordinal but also for certain uncountable ordinals, namely those whose -pieces are less than the Bachmann–Howard ordinal (viz.: write them in iterated base  representation and use the canonical representation for every piece).  This canonical notation is used for arguments of the  function (which may be uncountable).

Examples 

Beyond this, we may need to express ordinals beyond : this is always done in iterated -base, and the pieces themselves need to be expressed using the largest possible -number base which gives a non-trivial representation.

Note that while  is equal to the Bachmann–Howard ordinal, this is not a "canonical notation" in the sense we have defined (canonical notations are defined only for ordinals less than the Bachmann–Howard ordinal).

Conditions for canonicalness 

Standard sequences for ordinal notations 

To witness the fact that we have defined notations for ordinals below the Bachmann–Howard ordinal (which are all of countable cofinality), we might define standard sequences converging to any one of them (provided it is a limit ordinal, of course).  Actually we will define canonical sequences for certain uncountable ordinals, too, namely the uncountable ordinals of countable cofinality (if we are to hope to define a sequence converging to them...) which are representable (that is, all of whose -pieces are less than the Bachmann–Howard ordinal).

The following rules are more or less obvious, except for the last:
 if  is zero then  and there is nothing to be done;
 If  then take as fundamental sequence for  the sequence 
 If  then take as fundamental sequence for  the sequence 
 It remains to handle the case where  with  an ordinal of uncountable cofinality (e.g.,  itself). This  will be the first fixed point of a certain (continuous and non-decreasing) function . Using this notation, we can see that  quite easily. We can define the rest of the sequence using recursion: . (The examples below should make this clearer.)

Here are some examples for the last (and most interesting) case:

Here are some examples of the other cases:
(this is derived from the fundamental sequence for ).

A terminating process 
Start with any ordinal less than or equal to the Bachmann–Howard ordinal, and repeat the following process so long as it is not zero:
 if the ordinal is a successor, subtract one (that is, replace it with its predecessor),
 if it is a limit, replace it by some element of the canonical sequence defined for it.
Then it is true that this process always terminates (as any decreasing sequence of ordinals is finite); however, like (but even more so than for) the hydra game:
 it can take a very long time to terminate,
 the proof of termination may be out of reach of certain weak systems of arithmetic.

It appears as though the expressions are getting more and more complicated whereas, in fact, the ordinals always decrease.

Concerning the first statement, one could introduce, for any ordinal  less or equal to the Bachmann–Howard ordinal , the integer function  which counts the number of steps of the process before termination if one always selects the 'th element from the canonical sequence (this function satisfies the identity ).

Concerning the second statement, a precise version is given by ordinal analysis: for example, Kripke–Platek set theory can prove that the process terminates for any given  less than the Bachmann–Howard ordinal, but it cannot do this uniformly, i.e., it cannot prove the termination starting from the Bachmann–Howard ordinal.  Some theories like Peano arithmetic are limited by much smaller ordinals ( in the case of Peano arithmetic).

Variations on the example

Making the function less powerful 
It is instructive (although not exactly useful) to make  less powerful.

We then have  and so on until . This does not even go as far as the Feferman–Schütte ordinal.

This time,  and so on until  and similarly .

In both cases, we find that the limitation on the weakened  function comes not so much from the operations allowed on the countable ordinals as on the uncountable ordinals we allow ourselves to denote.

Going beyond the Bachmann–Howard ordinal 
We know that  is the Bachmann–Howard ordinal. One could try to add the  function (or the Veblen functions of so-many-variables) to the allowed primitives beyond addition, multiplication and exponentiation, but that does not get us very far. To create more systematic notations for countable ordinals, we need more systematic notations for uncountable ordinals: we cannot use the  function itself because it only yields countable ordinals (e.g.,  is, certainly not ), so the idea is to mimic its definition as follows:

Let  be the smallest ordinal which cannot be expressed from all countable ordinals and  using sums, products, exponentials, and the  function itself (to previously constructed ordinals less than ).

Here,  is a new ordinal guaranteed to be greater than all the ordinals which will be constructed using : again, letting  and  works.

Now we can reinject these notations in the original  function, modified as follows:

This modified function  coincides with the previous one up to (and including)  — which is the Bachmann–Howard ordinal.

A variation on this scheme, which makes little difference when using just two (or finitely many) collapsing functions, but becomes important for infinitely many of them, is to define
i.e., allow the use of  only for arguments less than  itself.

This system is also sensibly equivalent to the earlier (and much more difficult to grasp) "ordinal diagrams" of Takeuti and  functions of Feferman: their range is the same (which could be called the Takeuti-Feferman–Buchholz ordinal, and which describes the strength of -comprehension plus bar induction).

A "normal" variant 
Most definitions of ordinal collapsing functions found in the recent literature differ from the ones we have given in one technical but important way which makes them technically more convenient although intuitively less transparent.  We now explain this.

Then  is defined as the smallest ordinal  such that .

We can now make a change to the definition which makes it subtly different:

The first values of  coincide with those of : namely, for all  where , we have  because the additional clause  is always satisfied. On the other hand, we still have  (because  for all  so the extra condition does not come in play). Note in particular that , unlike , is not monotonic, nor is it continuous.

Despite these changes, the  function also defines a system of ordinal notations up to the Bachmann–Howard ordinal: the notations, and the conditions for canonicity, are slightly different (for example,  for all  less than the common value ).

Other similar OCFs

Arai's ψ 
Arai's ψ function is an ordinal collapsing function introduced by Toshiyasu Arai (husband of Noriko H. Arai) in his paper: A simplified ordinal analysis of first-order reflection.  is a collapsing function such that , where  represents the first uncountable ordinal (it can be replaced by the Church–Kleene ordinal at the cost of extra technical difficulty).

Suppose  for a -sentence . Using this, . One can then make the following conversions:

Bachmann's ψ 
The first true OCF, Bachmann's  was invented by Heinz Bachmann, somewhat cumbersome as it depends on fundamental sequences for all limit ordinals; and the original definition is complicated. Michael Rathjen has suggested a "recast" of the system, which goes like so: 

  is the smallest countable ordinal ρ such that 

 is the Bachmann–Howard ordinal, the proof-theoretic ordinal of Kripke–Platek set theory with the axiom of infinity (KP).

Buchholz's ψ 

This function is likely the most well known out of all OCFs. The definition is so:

 
 
 
 

Extended Buchholz's ψ 

This OCF is a sophisticated extension of Buchholz's  by mathematician Denis Maksudov. The limit of this system is much greater, equal to  where  denotes the first omega fixed point, sometimes referred to as Extended Buchholz's ordinal. The function is defined as follows:

Madore's ψ 
This OCF was the same as the ψ function previously used throughout this article; it is a simpler, more efficient version of Buchholz's ψ function defined by David Madore. Its use in this article lead to widespread use of the function. 

 
 
 
 

This function was used by Chris Bird, who also invented the next OCF.

Bird's θ 
Chris Bird devised the following shorthand for the extended Veblen function :

 
  is abbreviated 

Jäger's ψ 
Jäger's ψ is a hierarchy of single-argument ordinal functions ψκ indexed by uncountable regular cardinals κ smaller than the least weakly Mahlo cardinal M0 introduced by German mathematician Gerhard Jäger in 1984. It was developed on the base of Buchholz's approach.

 If  for some α < κ, .
 If  for some α, β < κ, .
 
 For every finite n,  is the smallest set satisfying the following:
 For any , .
 For any , .
 For any ordinal γ and uncountable regular cardinal , .
 For any  and uncountable regular cardinal , .

Simplified Jäger's ψ 
This is a sophisticated simplification of Jäger's ψ created by Denis Maksudov. An ordinal is α-weakly inaccessible if it is uncountable, regular and it is a limit of γ-weakly inaccessible cardinals for γ < α. Let I(α, 0) be the first α-weakly inaccessible cardinal, I(α, β + 1) be the first α-weakly inaccessible cardinal after I(α, β) and I(α, β) =  for limit β. Then,

Rathjen's Ψ 

Rathjen's Ψ function is based on the least weakly compact cardinal to create large countable ordinals.

 M0 = , where Lim denotes the class of limit ordinals.
 For α > 0,  Mα is the set  is stationary in 
  is the closure of  under addition,  given ξ < K,  given ξ < α, and  given .
 .
 For , .

Collapsing large cardinals 
As noted in the introduction, the use and definition of ordinal collapsing functions is strongly connected with the theory of ordinal analysis, so the collapse of this or that large cardinal must be mentioned simultaneously with the theory for which it provides a proof-theoretic analysis.

 Gerhard Jäger and Wolfram Pohlers described the collapse of an inaccessible cardinal to describe the ordinal-theoretic strength of Kripke–Platek set theory augmented by the recursive inaccessibility of the class of ordinals (KPi), which is also proof-theoretically equivalent to -comprehension plus bar induction. Roughly speaking, this collapse can be obtained by adding the  function itself to the list of constructions to which the  collapsing system applies.
 Michael Rathjen then described the collapse of a Mahlo cardinal to describe the ordinal-theoretic strength of Kripke–Platek set theory augmented by the recursive Mahloness of the class of ordinals (KPM).
 Rathjen later described the collapse of a weakly compact cardinal to describe the ordinal-theoretic strength of Kripke–Platek set theory augmented by certain reflection principles (concentrating on the case of -reflection).  Very roughly speaking, this proceeds by introducing the first cardinal  which is -hyper-Mahlo and adding the  function itself to the collapsing system.
These are used to carry out ordinal analysis of Kripke–Platek set theory augmented by -reflection principles. 
 Rathjen has begun the investigation of the collapse of yet larger cardinals, with the ultimate goal of achieving an ordinal analysis of -comprehension (which is proof-theoretically equivalent to the augmentation of Kripke–Platek by -separation).

Notes

References 
  
 
 
 
 
 
 
 
 
 (slides of a talk given at Fischbachau)

Ordinal numbers